Adam Irigoyen (born August 5, 1997) is an American actor, singer, rapper and dancer. He is best known for his role as Deuce Martinez in the Disney Channel series Shake It Up.

Early life
Adam Irigoyen was born August 5, 1997, in Miami, Florida. He attended Christina M. Eve Elementary and has revisited his old schools to talk to students. He currently lives in Southern California with his mother Annie, who is a teacher, his father Eric, who is also an educator, his younger brother Jake (born January 21, 2004) and his older sister Kimberly (born March 10). Irigoyen likes dancing and enjoys playing sports, particularly basketball. His parents are Cuban.

Career
Irigoyen started his acting career when he was 11 years old. He appeared in commercials and print advertisements before taking a guest-starring role in the Disney Channel sitcom Wizards of Waverly Place. It was his first guest star role ever "super grateful because at the time" that was his "favorite show."

Irigoyen has also appeared in the independent films Electrical & Natural Gas Safe, Flight and Nickel or Dime. He co-starred in the Disney Channel series Shake It Up as Martin "Deuce" Martinez, long-time friend to CeCe Jones and Rocky Blue (Bella Thorne and Zendaya). He guest-starred in Charlie Shakes It Up, a first-ever Good Luck Charlie and Shake It Up crossover event that was broadcast on June 5, 2011. Irigoyen sang "Show Ya How" with Kenton Duty which is on the Shake It Up album Live to Dance. He is known for his single "School Girl" and for starring I.aM.mE's dancer Chachi Gonzalez. He was a guest star in "Fresh Off the Boat", portraying Brendan, one of the teenage boys.

He has also played in Underdog Kids. Beginning in 2015, Irigoyen has portrayed Ray Diaz on the TV series The Last Ship.

Filmography

Film

Television

Discography

Awards and nominations

References

External links

1997 births
Living people
American male child actors
American male television actors
Hispanic and Latino American male actors
Male actors from Miami
American people of Cuban descent